Charles Seiyo Chihara (July 19, 1932 – February 16, 2020) was an American philosopher specializing in the philosophy of mathematics and metaphysics.

Early life and education 
Born to Japanese-American parents in Seattle, Chihara spent part of his youth in an internment camp during World War II. After graduating from O'Dea High School, he earned a Bachelor of Science degree in mathematics from the University of Seattle, a Master of Science in mathematics from Purdue University, and a PhD in philosophy from the University of Washington.

Career 
For most of his career, Chihara served as a member of the faculty of the Department of Philosophy at University of California, Berkeley.  In the philosophy of mathematics, Chihara is known for his work on nominalism, structuralism, and the liar paradox.

References

1932 births
2020 deaths
20th-century American mathematicians
American philosophers
21st-century American mathematicians

University of California, Berkeley alumni
Seattle University alumni
Purdue University alumni
University of Washington alumni
Philosophers from Washington (state)
Philosophers of mathematics
American logicians
Educators from Seattle